The 2019–20 season was the 109th season in Hajduk Split’s history and their twenty-ninth in the Prva HNL.

First-team squad
For details of former players, see List of HNK Hajduk Split players.

Competitions

Overall

Last updated: 25 July 2020.

HT Prva liga

Classification

Results summary

Results by round

Results by opponent

Source: 2019–20 Croatian First Football League article

Matches

Friendlies

Pre-season

On-season

Mid-season

HT Prva liga

Source: Croatian Football Federation

Croatian Cup

Source: Croatian Football Federation

UEFA Europa League

First qualifying round 

Source: uefa.com

Player seasonal records
Updated 8 April 2021

Goals

Source: Competitive matches

Clean sheets

Source: Competitive matches

Disciplinary record

Appearances and goals

Overview of statistics

Transfers

In

Total spending:  2,950,000 €

Out

Total income:  8,250,000 €

Total expenditure:  5,300,000 €

Promoted from youth squad

Notes

References

2019–20
Croatian football clubs 2019–20 season
2019–20 UEFA Europa League participants seasons